José de San Martín is a town in Chubut Province, Argentina. It is the head town of the Tehuelches Department.

The town is named after José de San Martín, the Argentine General who  liberated Argentina from the Spanish empire.

External links

Populated places in Chubut Province